Caihua, or "colour painting", is the traditional Chinese decorative painting or polychrome used for architecture and one of the most notable and important features of historical Chinese architecture. It held a significant artistic and practical role within the development of East-Asian architecture, as Caihua served not only decoration but also protection of the predominantly wooden architecture from various seasonal elements and hid the imperfections of the wood itself. The use of different colours or paintings would be according to the particular building functions and local regional customs, as well as historical periods. The choice of colours and symbology are based on traditional Chinese philosophies of the Five Elements and other ritualistic principles.

The Caihua is often separated into three layer structures; timber or lacquer layer, plaster layer, and pigment layer.

History

The origins of Caihua can be traced back to the Zhou dynasty, as the Zuo Zhuan and Guliang Zhuan detailed: . The Rites of Zhou similarly records a ritualistic usage of motifs and colour, based on each respective aspects' corresponding symbolic value.

Gallery

See also
 Hexi Caihua
 Ancient Chinese wooden architecture
 Chinese Architecture
 Yingzao Fashi
 Architecture of the Song Dynasty
 Dancheong

References

External links

 http://www.gd.gov.cn/zjgd/lnwh/fywh/ctms/content/post_108920.html
Chinese art
Architectural styles
Architectural elements
Chinese painting
Architecture in China
Chinese architectural history